Pioneer heroes is the term used to refer to Soviet pioneers who made feats in the years of the establishment of Soviet power and the Great Patriotic War.

The images of pioneer heroes were actively used in the Soviet Union as examples of high morals. The official list of pioneer heroes was issued in 1954  with the compilation of the Book of Honor of the Vladimir Lenin All-Union Pioneer Organization; The books of honor of local pioneer organizations joined it.

Pioneer heroes before the Second World War

The first mention of pioneers-heroes appears in 1920. The press began to publish newspaper notes about the exploits of young "fighters against the class enemy",  especially Pavlik Morozov. At the XII Congress of the Komsomol in 1954, the Book of Honor of the Vladimir Lenin All-Union Pioneer Organization was created. Morozov was the first in this book, according to the official version, bravely exposing the crimes of kulaks against Soviet power and killed by them. The second one was Kolya Myagotin, also killed by class enemies. The art description of some of the pioneers, in particular Pavlik Morozov, Grisha Aakopyan  and some others included in the "Book of Honor of the All-Union Pioneer Organization" until 1941 is not true. Morozov, according to Yuri Druzhnikov was never a pioneer, and other heroes of the 1930s who were killed by class enemies: Kolya Myagotin, Grisha Akopyan (completely fictional character).

References

Vladimir Lenin All-Union Pioneer Organization